Nandivaram-Guduvancheri is a municipality located in Chengalpattu district in the Indian state of Tamil Nadu.

Demographics
 India census, Nandivaram-Guduvancheri had a population of 44,098. Males constitute 51% of the population and females 49%. Nandivaram-Guduvancheri has an average literacy rate of 79%, higher than the national average of 59.5%: male literacy is 85%, and female literacy is 74%. In Nandivaram-Guduvancheri, 10% of the population is under 6 years of age

Schools & Education
 Government Boys Higher Secondary School Nandhivaram
 Bharathiyar Metric School
 Panchayat Union Primary School Nandivaram
 Kamarajapuram Primary School Nandivaram
 Govt Girls Higher secondary school
 SRM Public school
 Velammal Vidhyashram School
 HolySai International school

Apartments
 Lancor Lumina
 Shambhavi Apartments
 SB Homes
 Shriram Shankari Apartments
 SIS Queenstown

References

Cities and towns in Kanchipuram district